José de Anchieta Júnior (11 March 1965 – 6 December 2018) was a Brazilian politician and member of the Brazilian Social Democracy Party (PSDB). He served as the Governor of the northern Brazilian state of Roraima from the death of his predecessor, the late Governor Ottomar Pinto, in December 2007 to April 2014.

Biography 
Anchieta was originally elected as the Vice Governor of Roraima. Roraima Governor Ottomar Pinto died in office on December 11, 2007, and Anchieta was sworn in as his successor. Anchieta was elected to a full term in 2010.

Anchieta was married to deputy Shéridan Oliveira.

He died on December 6, 2018, a victim of a heart attack. He was buried in Ceará.

References

1965 births
2018 deaths
People from Ceará
Governors of Roraima
Brazilian Social Democracy Party politicians